Lepidokirbyia vittipes is a moth of the family Erebidae first described by Francis Walker in 1855. It is found in Panama, Brazil, Suriname, Paraguay, Ecuador, Peru and Colombia.

Subspecies
Lepidokirbyia vittipes vittipes (Brazil)
Lepidokirbyia vittipes vitellina (Seitz, 1921) (Colombia)

References

Phaegopterina
Moths described in 1855